Anaxagorea is a genus of flowering plants in the subfamily Anaxagoreoideae (of which it is the only genus) in the family Annonaceae. There are about 26 species, distributed in Central and South America.

Species include:

 Anaxagorea acuminata
 Anaxagorea allenii
 Anaxagorea angustifolia
 Anaxagorea borneensis (Becc.) J.Sinclair
 Anaxagorea brachycarpa
 Anaxagorea brevipedicellata
 Anaxagorea brevipes
 Anaxagorea crassipetala
 Anaxagorea dolichocarpa
 Anaxagorea floribunda
 Anaxagorea gigantophylla
 Anaxagorea guatemalensis
 Anaxagorea inundata
 Anaxagorea javanica
 Anaxagorea luzonensis
 Anaxagorea macrantha
 Anaxagorea manausensis
 Anaxagorea pachypetala
 Anaxagorea panamensis
 Anaxagorea petiolata
 Anaxagorea phaeocarpa, Mart.
 Anaxagorea prinoides
 Anaxagorea radiata
 Anaxagorea rheophytica
 Anaxagorea rufa
 Anaxagorea silvatica

A. radiata is a little-known species that may belong within A. javanica.

References

 
Annonaceae genera
Taxonomy articles created by Polbot